Resemblance may refer to:
Similarity (philosophy)
Resemblance nominalism
Family Resemblance (anthropology)
Ludwig Wittgenstein's family resemblances
In text mining, the degree to which two documents resemble each other, calculated using shingles
No Resemblance Whatsoever, a 1995 album by American singer-songwriter Dan Fogelberg and jazz flutist Tim Weisberg
Facial resemblance, a word that has been observed to enhance trustworthiness